Sanning eller konsekvens is a 1997 Swedish film directed by Christina Olofson.

Plot
Nora is in sixth grade in the Högalid School (Högalidsskolan) in Stockholm. She is torn between spending time with the cool girls Fanny and Sabina and the bullied Karin.

Cast
Tove Edfeldt as Nora
Anna Gabrielsson as Karin
Alexandra Dahlström as Fanny
Emelina Lindberg-Filippopoulou as Sabina
Katja Steinholtz-Skog as Maja
Ellen Swedenmark as Emma
Totte Steneby as Tobbe
Bobo Steneby as Jonas
Fredrik Ådén as Emil
Erik Johansson as Anton
Carina Lidbom as Lena, Nora's mother
Suzanne Reuter as Gunilla, teacher
Lena-Pia Bernhardsson as Karin's mother
Jonas Falk as Karin's father
Maria Grip as Sabina's mother
Göran Forsmark as the naked man
Lasse Lindroth as Ismet
Lena B. Eriksson as Emma's mother
Håkan Fohlin as the gym teacher
Kalle Spets as Kalle
Noomi Rapace as Nadja

References

External links

Swedish drama films
1997 films
1997 drama films
1990s Swedish-language films
1990s Swedish films

de:Ich hätte nein sagen können